Rohaniya is a village and corresponding community development block in Unchahar tehsil of Rae Bareli district, Uttar Pradesh, India. It is located 43 km from Raebareli, the district headquarters. As of 2011, Rohaniya has a population of 3,880 people, in 751 households. It has one primary school and no healthcare facilities.

The 1961 census recorded Rohaniya (as "Rohania") as comprising 8 hamlets, with a total population of 1,488 people (732 male and 756 female), in 337 households and 335 physical houses. The area of the village was given as 1,904 acres and was electrified at that point.

The 1981 census recorded Rohaniya as having a population of 2,126 people, in 430 households, and having an area of 770.52 hectares. The main staple foods were listed as wheat and rice.

Villages
Rohaniya CD block has the following 53 villages:

References

Villages in Raebareli district
Community development blocks in India